HLZ may refer to:
 Haldia railway station, in West Bengal, India
 Hamilton Airport (New Zealand)
 Croatian Medical Association
 Helicopter Landing Zone, a pre-prepared area of ground for a helicopter to land on.